Aberdeen is a coastal neighborhood in the northwestern part of Sierra Leone's capital Freetown. It is home to numerous up-scale restaurants, hotels, nightclubs  and other tourist facilities. Cape Sierra Leone is located at the northwestern end of the Sierra Leone Peninsula in Aberdeen. The white sandy Aberdeen-Lumley Beach stretches all the way from the cape down to neighbouring Lumley, along the western part of the peninsula.

History
Aberdeen was founded in 1829 provide accommodation for recaptives, liberated enslaved Africans, who had been brought to Freetown by the British Royal Navy West Africa Squadron.

References

External links
 Official government tourism website

Neighbourhoods in Freetown
Sierra Leone Liberated African villages

Populated places established by Sierra Leone Creoles